Histoid leprosy is a skin condition, a rare form of multibacillary leprosy.

See also 
 Skin lesion

References 

Bacterium-related cutaneous conditions